Paul Finn (born 1973 in Oulart, County Wexford, Ireland) is an Irish retired sportsperson.  He played hurling with his local club Oulart–The Ballagh and was a member of the Wexford senior inter-county team from 1994 until 2001.

References

1973 births
Living people
Oulart-the-Ballagh hurlers
Wexford inter-county hurlers
All-Ireland Senior Hurling Championship winners